The Musée Édouard Branly is a museum dedicated to the work of radio pioneer Édouard Branly (1844-1940). It is located in the 6th arrondissement at the Institut Catholique de Paris-ISEP, 21, rue d'Assas, Paris, France, and open by appointment only.

The museum contains the research laboratory and equipment used by Édouard Branly, a physics professor at the Institut Catholique de Paris and inventor of the first widely used radio receiver, the Branly coherer circa 1884-1886. Its collection includes a number of early devices used in wireless experiments, such as electrolytic detectors, insulated tubes filled with metal filings, a Righi oscillator, generators, electromagnets, metallic blades mounted on glass, electrical contacts, and a column of six steel balls stacked in a glass cylinder.

See also 
 Musée du quai Branly, an art museum
 List of museums in Paris

References 

 Musée Edouard Branly - Institut Catholique de Paris
 Paris.org entry
 ParisInfo entry
 Jean-Claude Boudenot, Comment Branly a découvert la radio, EDP Sciences Editions, 2005, page 53. .
 Musée Branly: appareils et matériaux d'expériences, Association des amis d'Edouard Branly, Musée Branly, 1997.

Museums in Paris
Buildings and structures in the 6th arrondissement of Paris
Telecommunications museums
Science museums in France
Branly